The Piedmontese regional election of 2014 took place on 25 May 2014.

Electoral system
Regional elections in Piedmont were ruled by the "Tatarella law" (approved in 1995), which provided for a mixed electoral system: four fifths of the regional councilors were elected in provincial constituencies by proportional representation, using the largest remainder method with a droop quota and open lists, while the residual votes and the unassigned seats were grouped into a "single regional constituency", where the whole ratios and the highest remainders were divided with the Hare method among the provincial party lists; one fifth of the council seats instead was reserved for regional lists and assigned with a majoritarian system: the leader of the regional list that scored the highest number of votes was elected to the presidency of the Region while the other candidates were elected regional councilors.

A threshold of 3% had been established for the provincial lists, which, however, could still have entered the regional council if the regional list to which they were connected had scored at least 5% of valid votes.

The panachage was also allowed: the voter can indicate a candidate for the presidency but prefer a provincial list connected to another candidate.

Background 
It was a snap election, prompted by the dissolution of the Regional Council by the Regional Administrative Tribunal on the grounds that one of the lists supporting Roberto Cota (Northern League) in the 2010 regional election (which saw Cota narrowly defeating Mercedes Bresso, the incumbent Democratic President) had committed irregularities in filing the slates for the election.

In 2014 Cota chose not to stand again for President and the parties composing his coalition failed to agree on a single candidate, resulting in a landslide victory for Sergio Chiamparino, a Democrat who had been Mayor of Turin from 2001 to 2011.

Parties and candidates

Results

References

Elections in Piedmont
2014 elections in Italy